William M. Kaula (May 19, 1926 – April 1, 2000) was an Australian-born American geophysicist and professor at the University of California, Los Angeles.
Kaula was most notable for his contributions to geodesy, including using early satellites to produce maps of Earth's gravity.
He was a participant in several NASA missions, as a team leader on Apollo 15, 16, and 17.
The National Academies Press called Kaula "the father of space-based geodesy".
The Los Angeles Times called him "one of the leading planetary physicists of the last four decades".
He was a recipient of the Whitten Medal of the American Geophysical Union and the Brouwer Award of the American Astronomical Society.
He was elected to the National Academy of Sciences for his scientific contributions notwithstanding his not having a doctorate, a rare such instance. He graduated from West Point, the top military school in the United States and received an M.S. degree from Ohio State University.  Asteroid 5485 Kaula is named after him.

References

External links 

 Donald L. Turcotte, "William M. Kaula", Biographical Memoirs of the National Academy of Sciences (2002)

1926 births
2000 deaths
American geophysicists
NASA people
Members of the United States National Academy of Sciences
American people of Australian descent
University of California, Los Angeles faculty
American geodesists